Unchained is a 1955 prison film written, produced and directed by Hall Bartlett (the first film directed by Bartlett) and starring Elroy Hirsch, Barbara Hale, Chester Morris, Todd Duncan, and Johnny Johnston. Based on the non-fiction book Prisoners are People by Kenyon J. Scudder, it is most remembered for its theme song, "Unchained Melody".

Plot 
Steve Davitt is held in a medium security prison and is struggling with a choice between two options: serving his full sentence and returning legitimately to his wife and family, or escaping and ending up on the run. Having received what he considers to be an unjust recommendation from the Adult Authority Board, he decides to escape. However, he is surprised by a trustee-inmate whom he has befriended, and a fist-fight ensues. Davitt wins the fight, and heading for the barbed-wire fence starts to climb. He hesitates twice, and looking back to see his friend on the ground decides against escaping after all. The scene ends with him turning round and heading back to the prison.

Cast  
 Elroy Hirsch as Steve Davitt
 Barbara Hale as Mary Davitt
 Chester Morris as Kenyon Scudder
 Peggy Knudsen as Elaine
 Jerry Paris as Joe Ravens
 John Qualen as Leonard Haskins

Production

Development
The film was based on the career of Kenyon J. Scudder, former supervisor at Chino prison in California, as detailed in Scudder's book.

Casting
Former football player Elroy "Crazylegs" Hirsch played the lead character, while other inmates were played by Chester Morris and Jerry Paris (later of The Dick Van Dyke Show), among others. Others in the cast included Peggy Knudsen and Barbara Hale, who appeared as women visiting the prisoners. Jazz musician Dexter Gordon has a small, uncredited role in the film, that of a saxophone player in the prison jazz band.

Filming
The film was shot at the correctional facility in Chino, California, where Gordon was then serving time for possession of heroin.

Music 
The theme song "Unchained Melody" was written by Alex North and performed by Todd Duncan. This song has since become a standard and one of the most recorded songs of the 20th century, most notably by the Righteous Brothers in 1965. Over 1,500 recordings of "Unchained Melody" have been made by more than 670 artists, in multiple languages. In 1955, three versions of the song charted in the Top 10 in the United States, and four versions appeared in the Top 20 in the United Kingdom simultaneously, an unbeaten record for any song. The song continued to chart in the 21st century.

Recognition

Awards
 Oscar nomination: Best Music, Original Song: "Unchained Melody" - Music by Alex North; Lyrics by Hy Zaret

References

External links 
 
 
 

1955 films
1955 crime drama films
1950s prison films
American black-and-white films
American crime drama films
American prison drama films
Films based on non-fiction books
Films directed by Hall Bartlett
Films scored by Alex North
Films set in California
Warner Bros. films
1955 directorial debut films
1950s English-language films
1950s American films